The 2012 Weber State Wildcats football team represented Weber State University in the 2012 NCAA Division I FCS football season. In December 2011, John L. Smith was hired to be the new head coach.  That all changed on April 23, 2012. On April 23, John L. Smith was offered a one-year contract to be the new head coach of the Arkansas Razorbacks, so he left Weber State to take the position after being head coach for roughly  months. On April 26, Weber State announced that Jody Sears would serve as interim head coach for the 2012 season in addition to the defensive coordinator spot he was hired for earlier in April. Weber State played their home games at Stewart Stadium. They are a member of the Big Sky Conference. They finished the season 2–9, 2–6 in Big Sky play to finish in a tie for 11th place.

Before the season

2012 recruits

Spring Game
The Weber State Purple and White 2012 Spring game was held on April 13, 2012. The match featured the Weber offense against the Weber defense. The game would start 20 minutes late due to a lightning delay. Once the lightning ended though, it was the defense that struck down Weber offense. The defense picked Weber's QB's four times, two coming from redshirt freshman Roman Venezuela. The offense would score four touchdowns against Weber's D over roughly 110-plays, but it was the defense that controlled the game according to the coaches.

Schedule

Game summaries

Fresno State

Sources:

To open the season Weber faces another team with a new coaching staff. The match against Fresno State will be the Bulldogs coaching debut for Tim DeRuyter and will be only his second game as head coach overall.

BYU

Sources:

For only the third time in the schools histories, BYU and Weber State will meet in a collegiate football game.

McNeese State

Sources:

After a previous home-and-home series in 1990 and 1992, the Cowboys and Wildcats find themselves knotted in head-to-head matches at 1–1, with each team having won the road game. The winner of the 2012 match will take the lead in the series, but it could be short lived as this is part of a home-and-home series that will continue in Lake Charles in 2013.

Eastern Washington

Sources:

2012 will feature the 31st meeting between the Eagles and the Wildcats. The series has been fairly even, with the Eagles holding a slim 16–14 advantage overall. However, the two are dead even in the overall series when facing each other in Ogden at 8–8.

UC Davis

Sources:

The first conference road game for the Wildcats will feature the third ever meeting against UC Davis. Currently the series is even at 1–1. It will be the first trip for Weber to Davis as the previous two meetings (2004 & 2010) both took place in Ogden.

Cal Poly

Sources:

 
This will be the ninth meeting between the schools with the Wildcats leading the series at 5–3. Weber has won the two most recent meetings (2008 & 2009), but the Aggies won the three before that (2002, 2006, & 2007). This will be the fifth time the two schools have met in Ogden, with Weber holding a 3–1 advantage in the series at home.

Sacramento State

Sources:

The series between Weber and Sacramento State may be going on its 19th meeting, but the series has been largely in favor of the Wildcats. Weber leads the series 11–5. At Hornet Stadium the Wildcats are 3–5, and Sacramento State has won 3 of the last 4 meetings in Sacramento.

Southern Utah

Sources:

This will be the Thunderbirds and Wildcats 19th meeting. The series has been one-sided in favor of Weber State at 14–4. However, Southern Utah had won three of the previous four meetings (2003, 2005, and 2006) before they met last year. It will be the fifth meeting in Cedar City, with Weber owning a 3–1 advantage.

Montana

Sources:

The lone Weber State broadcast on the Big Sky game of the week will feature the 52nd meeting between the Wildcats and Montana. Montana has largely been in charge of this series, 38–13. Even in Ogden the Wildcats are a mere 7–17 against the Grizzlies. However Weber State has won the last two home contests (2008 & 2010).

Northern Colorado

Sources:

2012 features the seventh time that Northern Colorado and Weber State will meet. Northern Colorado is winless against Weber State (0–6).

Idaho State

Sources:

The regular season closes with the 52nd meeting against the Idaho State Bengals. Weber leads the series 37–14. Weber State has won the past 9 contests, 15 of the last 16, and 25 of the past 27 overall in the series. The Bengals did take four of five from 1980 to 1984.

References

Weber State
Weber State Wildcats football seasons
Weber State Wildcats football